Anadasmus obmutescens is a moth of the family Depressariidae. It is found in French Guiana and Brazil (Amazonas).

The wingspan is 29–31 mm. The forewings are light violet-fuscous, the costal edge ochreous-whitish. The plical and second discal stigmata are dark fuscous. There is a line of cloudy dark fuscous dots from beneath the costa at three-fourths to the dorsum before the tornus, angularly indented towards the costa, then moderately strongly curved. There is a terminal series of dark fuscous dots. The hindwings are rather dark grey.

References

Moths described in 1916
Anadasmus
Moths of South America